Lydia Simoneschi (4 April 1908 – 5 September 1981) was an Italian actress and voice actress. During her career, she gave her voice to actresses mainly during the Golden Ages.

Biography
Born in Rome and the daughter of silent film actor and director Carlo Simoneschi, she began her acting career when she was very young in Camillo Pilotto's stage company; in the early 1930s she made her film debut, but her inconspicuous physical appearance did not help her in front of the camera. However, her persuasive, passionate and sophisticated voice paved the way for her to become a voice actress.

From the early 1940s until the first half of the 1960s, Simoneschi became one of the most prominent Italian voice actresses, lending her voice to almost all the greatest Hollywood and European divas which include Barbara Stanwyck, Susan Hayward, Ingrid Bergman, Marlene Dietrich, Joan Crawford, Olivia de Havilland, Vivien Leigh and Maureen O'Hara. One of Simoneschi's main skills was that of being able to adapt very well to the different acting styles of the numerous actresses to whom she lent her voice. From 1964 she has also been a dubbing director and kept working in this environment until her retirement in 1976: in forty years of career as a voice actress, Simoneschi is estimated to have given her voice to over five thousand films.

Personal life
Simoneschi was married to Regia Marina member Franz Lehmann until his death in 1942. They had one son, Giorgio. She later had a second son, Gianni, with Franz Lehmann's brother Luigi on 9 May 1949. In the spring of 1980 the then President of Italy Sandro Pertini named her Knight of the Republic for her artistic merits.

Death
Simoneschi died in Rome on 5 September 1981, at the age of 73.

Filmography

Cinema
 The Old Lady (1932)
 Pergolesi (1932)
 Non c'è bisogno di denaro (1933)
 Bayonet (1936)
 Gli zitelloni (1958)
 The Moralist (1959)
 West and Soda (1965) - Voice
 VIP my Brother Superman (1968) - Voice

Dubbing career

Notable dubbed actresses
 
 Lauren Bacall
 Lucille Ball
 Anne Baxter
 Joan Bennett
 Ingrid Bergman
 Clara Calamai
 Claudette Colbert
 Valentina Cortese
 Joan Crawford
 Linda Darnell
 Danielle Darrieux
 Bette Davis
 Yvonne De Carlo
 Olivia de Havilland
 Marlene Dietrich
 Joan Fontaine
 Ava Gardner
 Lillian Gish
 Susan Hayward
 Katharine Hepburn
 Betty Hutton
 Jennifer Jones
 Lila Kedrova
 Deborah Kerr
 Angela Lansbury
 Vivien Leigh
 Gina Lollobrigida
 Sophia Loren
 Myrna Loy
 Ida Lupino
 Silvana Mangano
 Michèle Morgan
 Maureen O'Hara
 Eleanor Parker
 Donna Reed
 Ginger Rogers
 Eleonora Rossi Drago
 Jane Russell
 Margaret Rutherford
 Simone Signoret
 Barbara Stanwyck
 Gene Tierney
 Alida Valli
 Shelley Winters
 Jane Wyman

Animated characters
 The Blue Fairy in Pinocchio
 Bambi's mother in Bambi
 Fairy Godmother in Cinderella (1967 redub)
 Fairy Flora in Sleeping Beauty
 Nanny in One Hundred and One Dalmatians
 Madam Mim in The Sword in the Stone
 Winifred in The Jungle Book
 Lady Kluck in Robin Hood

References

External links

1908 births
1981 deaths
Actresses from Rome
Italian film actresses
Italian voice actresses
Italian stage actresses
Italian radio actresses
Italian voice directors
20th-century Italian actresses
Burials at the Cimitero Flaminio